Weng is a Chinese surname. It is also spelled Yung based on its Cantonese pronunciation, Eng based on its Teochew pronunciation, or Ong based on its Hokkien pronunciation.

Notable people
 Weng Chang-liang (born 1965), retired Taiwanese politician
 Weng Fanggang (1733–1818), Chinese calligrapher, literary critic, philosopher, and poet
 Weng Hongyang (born 1999), Chinese male badminton player
 Weng Tonghe (1830–1904), Chinese Confucian scholar
 Weng Zuliang (born 1963), Chinese politician

References

Chinese-language surnames
Individual Chinese surnames